Per Ludvig Julius Thorén (26 January 1885 – 5 January 1962) was a Swedish figure skater in the early 20th century who won a bronze medal at the 1908 Olympic Games. In Europe, the half loop jump, a variation of the loop jump, was often referred to as the Thorén jump.

Results

References

External links

1885 births
1962 deaths
Figure skaters at the 1908 Summer Olympics
Swedish male single skaters
Olympic bronze medalists for Sweden
Olympic figure skaters of Sweden
Olympic medalists in figure skating
World Figure Skating Championships medalists
European Figure Skating Championships medalists
Medalists at the 1908 Summer Olympics
Sportspeople from Stockholm